Bhaṭṭa Nārāyaṇa Mṛgarājalakśman, also known as Nishānārāyana, was a Sanskrit scholar and writer who belonged to the Pancharatra Rarhi branch of Sandilya family of Brahmins. He lived before 800 A.D. for he is cited by Vāmana (iv.3.28) in about 800 A.D. and by Ānandavardhana who refers to him more than once. He is believed to have been summoned from Kanyakubja (Kannauj) to Bengal by King Ādisūra, who ruled before the Pala dynasty came to power in the middle of the eighth century, and who in 671 A.D. was a contemporary of Ādityasena, son of Madhavagupta, who ruled Kanyakubja.

Bhaṭṭa Nārāyaṇa, who is believed to have converted to Buddhism, was a disciple of Dharmakirti with whom he co-authored Rupavatara. Dandin in his Avantisundarikatha refers to Bhaṭṭa Nārāyaṇa as author of three books but who is more widely known as the author of Venisamhara that dramatizes in six Acts some incidents from the Mahabharata. The construction of this drama may be bad but characterization is vigorous; many violent situations are described in long narrative digressions in poetic but undramatic style, yet there are graces of poetry, power of crude and furious descriptions, of impressive sonorous diction, of vivid depiction of detached scenes and situations, and of vigorous characterization. The Tagore family and the Nadia Raj family claims their descent from Bhaṭṭa Nārāyaṇa.

See also
 List of Sanskrit plays in English translation

References

Hindu poets
Sanskrit dramatists and playwrights
Indian male poets
7th-century Indian poets
Sanskrit poets